Kerron Speid (born May 25, 1972) is a retired male boxer from Jamaica, who won the bronze medal in the heavyweight division at the 1999 Pan American Games in Winnipeg, Manitoba, Canada, together with Brazil's Marcelino Novaes.

Speid was a three-time Caribbean heavyweight amateur boxing champion, and he finished his career with a record of 28-4-0. He made his professional debut in 2002, winning the first bout with a third-round knockout of Ohio's Luis Depp in Philadelphia, and losing the second on points to Patrick Nuamu of New York.

References
 

1972 births
Living people
Heavyweight boxers
Boxers at the 1999 Pan American Games
Pan American Games bronze medalists for Jamaica
Jamaican male boxers
Pan American Games medalists in boxing
Medalists at the 1999 Pan American Games